Nikifor is a  Slavic personal name derived from the Greek name Nikiforos, "Bringer of Victory". 

Belarusian: Nichypar, Nikifar
Russian: Nikifor
Ukrainian: Nychypir, Nykyfor
Romanian: Nichifor, Nechifor
The name may refer to:

 Nikifor, a Polish painter
 Nikifor Begichev, a Russian Arctic explorer
 Nykyfor Hryhoriv, a Ukrainian guerrilla fighter
 Nikifor Krylov, a Russian artist